Mukhtar Mohammed (born 1 December 1990) is a Somali-born British middle-distance runner specialising in the 800 metres. He was born in Qoryoley. He was active internationally between 2011 and 2016.

Mohammed first came to international attention winning the bronze medal in the 800 metres at the 2011 European under-23 Athletics Championships. In 2013, he made his senior breakthrough, gaining a bronze medal in the 800 metres at the 2013 European Athletics Indoor Championships.

He competed at the 2012 European Championships, the 2014 World Indoor Championships, the 2014 Commonwealth Games and the 2015 European Indoor Championships without reaching the final. His personal best time was 1:45.67 minutes, achieved in July 2013 in London.

Mohammed has not registered any senior result since 2016, and has not been selected for a Great Britain team since that date.

References

External links
 Tilastopaja.org profile

1990 births
Living people
People from Lower Shebelle

Somalian emigrants to the United Kingdom
Athletes (track and field) at the 2014 Commonwealth Games
Commonwealth Games competitors for England
English male middle-distance runners